Nippoptilia distigmata is a moth of the family Pterophoridae. It is known from Korea.

Etymology
The specific name of the new species is derived from the Greek, di (meaning two) and stigma (meaning spot), referring to two spots on the thorax.

References

Platyptiliini
Moths described in 2010